Donovan Daniel Carrillo Suazo (born 17 November 1999) is a Mexican figure skater. He is the 2019 Philadelphia International silver medalist and a four-time Mexican national champion. He has competed in the final segment at six ISU Championships – two World Championships (2018, 2021), three Four Continents (2018–2020), and the 2018 World Junior Championships. He has earned the highest placement by any Mexican skater at a World Championships and qualified to the 2022 Winter Olympics in Beijing.

Personal life 
Carrillo was born on 17 November 1999 in Zapopan, Jalisco, Mexico. Before taking up skating, he was enrolled in gymnastics and diving. His parents are physical education teachers. He has three sisters: Daphne, Daniela and Sonny.

Skating career

Early years 
Carrillo began learning to skate in Guadalajara when he was eight years old.
In 2013, he moved to León to keep training with his Coach Gregorio Nuñez.

His junior international debut came in September 2013 at a Junior Grand Prix (JGP) event in Mexico City, where he placed 15th overall.

2014–2015 season 
Carrillo received two JGP assignments. In September, he placed twenty-first at the 2014 Czech Skate after placing twenty-first in both segments. In October, he placed twenty-second at the 2014 JGP Pokal der Blauen Schwerter. Later in the season, he won the junior men's title at the Mexican Championships.

2015–2016 season 
In 2015, Carrillo placed eighth at the 2015 Santa Claus Cup in Budapest in the junior men's competition.

2016–2017 season 
Returning to the JGP series, Carrillo placed thirteenth in September in Yokohama, Japan. In October, he finished ninth at a JGP competition in Dresden, Germany.

In March, he placed twenty-seventh in the short program at the 2017 World Junior Championships in Taipei, Taiwan, and did not advance to the free skate.

2017–2018 season 
Making his senior international debut, Carrillo placed ninth at the Philadelphia Summer International in early August 2017. Later that month, he achieved his career-best JGP result, finishing seventh in Brisbane, Australia. In September, he competed at the 2017 CS Nebelhorn Trophy, the final qualifying opportunity for the 2018 Winter Olympics. He ranked nineteenth in the short program, twelfth in the free skate, and fourteenth overall, which was not enough for an Olympic spot.

In January, Carrillo qualified to the final segment at the 2018 Four Continents Championships in Taipei; he ranked twenty-second in the short program, seventeenth in the free skate, and eighteenth overall. In March, Carrillo qualified for the final segment at Junior Worlds, placing eighteenth in the short program and twenty-second in the free skate to finish twenty-first overall. Two weeks later, at the World Championships, Donovan placed twenty-fourth in the short program and qualified for the free. He placed twenty-first in the free program and finished twenty-second overall.

He trains mainly in León, Guanajuato, coached by Gregorio Núñez.

2018–2019 season 
Carrillo started the season at 2018 JGP Bratislava, where he placed eleventh in both segments and placed eleventh overall. He was offered a second Junior Grand Prix assignment in Linz, Austria, but had to decline because he could not afford to attend the competition. He was assigned to the 2018 CS Autumn Classic International but withdrew before the event. He had sustained a right ankle injury. At the 2019 Four Continents Championships in January, he placed fourteenth in the short program (and thus qualified for the final segment), placed twentieth in the free program, and seventeenth overall.  At Four Continents, Carrillo landed a triple Axel for the first time.

In February 2019, the Comisión Nacional de Cultura Física y Deporte announced that Carrillo would be granted funding beginning in March.  Carrillo aggravated his ankle injury before the 2019 World Championships, and did not make the free skate.

2019–2020 season 
Carrillo won his first international medal, a silver, at the 2019 Philadelphia Summer International. Assigned to two Challenger events, he placed tenth at the 2019 CS Autumn Classic International and seventeenth at the 2019 CS Golden Spin of Zagreb. Competing at the 2020 Four Continents Championships, Carrillo placed fifteenth with new personal bests but came up 0.20 points short of the free skate technical score necessary to qualify to compete at the 2020 World Championships.

Due to the pandemic, Carrillo could not train on ice for four months, but the delivery of a harness and spinners allowed him to continue practicing jumps at his coach's house.

2020–2021 season 
At the International Challenge Cup, held in late February in the Netherlands, Carrillo earned the necessary technical minimum to compete at the 2021 World Championships, which took place in Stockholm in March. In Sweden, he qualified to his second Worlds free skate by placing twenty-third in the short program. Ranked nineteenth in the final segment, he would finish twentieth overall. With his placement, he qualified a men's singles quota spot for Mexico at the 2022 Winter Olympics.

2021–2022 season 
Carrillo started the season at the Skating Club of Boston's Cranberry Cup, where he finished in ninth place. Competing at the Festival Abierto Mexicano, Carrillo won the gold medal and became the first Mexican skater ever to land a quadruple jump, the quadruple Salchow, in a competition. At the 2021 U.S. Classic, Carrillo finished in fifth place with new personal bests. At the 2021 CS Finlandia Trophy, he became the first Mexican to land a quadruple Salchow in combination in an international competition. Scoring a new personal best in his free skate, Carrillo finished in fifteenth.

After winning his fourth national title at the Mexican championships, Carrillo was named to the Mexican Olympic team and opted to withdraw from the 2022 Four Continents Championships to minimize the risk of catching COVID-19 in the interim. Shortly afterward, he was named one of Mexico's flagbearers for the opening ceremonies, alongside alpine skier Sarah Schleper. Carrillo scored a new personal best of 79.69 in the short program of the Olympic men's event, placing nineteenth and becoming the first Mexican skater to qualify for the free skate segment at the Olympic Games. He called it "a dream come true." Placing twenty-second in the free skate, he finished twenty-second overall.

Carrillo was scheduled to finish the season at the 2022 World Championships in Montpellier but was forced to withdraw after his skates were lost in transit.

2022–2023 season 
Carrillo finished eighth at the 2022 CS U.S. Classic and then was invited to make his senior Grand Prix debut at the 2022 Skate America. He finished twelfth at the event.

Programs

Competitive highlights 
CS: Challenger Series; JGP: Junior Grand Prix

Detailed results 
Historic ISU personal best scores highlighted in bold and italic. Current ISU personal best scores highlighted in bold.''

Senior

Junior

Notes

References

External links 
 

1999 births
Mexican male single skaters
Living people
People from Zapopan, Jalisco
Figure skaters at the 2022 Winter Olympics
Olympic figure skaters of Mexico